Paopi (Paōpe), also known as Phaophi (Phaōphí) and Babah (Baba), is the second month of the ancient Egyptian and Coptic calendars. It lasts between 11 October and 9 November of the Gregorian calendar, unless the previous Coptic year was a leap year. The month of Paopi is the second month of the Season of Akhet (Inundation) in Ancient Egypt, when the Nile floods inundated the land. (They have not done so since the construction of the High Dam at Aswan.)

Name
Paopi means "that of Opet", for the month originally celebrated the "Beautiful feast of Opet". The ancient Egyptians believed that during this month, the sun deity Amon-Ra travelled from Karnak to Luxor to celebrate the famous festival of Opet.

Coptic Synaxarium of the month of Paopi

See also
 Egyptian, Coptic, and Islamic calendars

References

Citations

Bibliography
  Synaxarium of the month of Babah

Months of the Coptic calendar
Egyptian calendar